Kilmurry Ibrickane is a civil parish in County Clare, Ireland, The parish is part of the historic barony of Ibrickane. In 1837, it was co-extensive with the parish of the Established Church and of the Catholic Church. The civil parish contains the tiny settlement of Kilmurry which was the location of the church before the Cromwellian conquest of Ireland. Today, an ecclesiastical parish in the Roman Catholic Diocese of Killaloe of the same name exists which covers part of the civil parish. In the Church of Ireland, the parish is part of the "Drumcliffe Union with Kilnasoolagh"Clare Anglicans - "Drumcliffe Union with Kilnasoolagh" which covers the western part of the county of Clare, roughly that part located to the west of the M18 motorway.

Townlands 
The civil parish is divided into 52 townlands:

Annagh 	
Ballymackea Beg 	
Ballymackea More
Caherrush
Carrowduff 
Carrowlagan
Carrownagry North 
Carrownagry South
Cloghauninchy 
Cloghaunnatinny 
Cloonadrum 
Cloonlaheen East
Cloonlaheen Middle 	
Cloonlaheen West 	
Coor East 
Coor West
Craggaun 
Craggaknock East 
Craggaknock West 	
Creevagh
Derreen
Doolough 
Doonogan 
Doonsallagh East
Doonsallagh West 
Drummin 
Emlagh 	
Finnor Beg
Finnor More 	
Kilclehaun 
Killernan 
Knockanalban
Knocknahila Beg 	
Knocknahila More North 
Knocknahila More South 
Knockloskeraun
Lissyneillan 
Molosky 
Moyglass Beg 
Moyglass More
Mutton Island 
Quilty East 
Quilty West 	
Rineroe
Seafield 
Shanavogh East 
Shanavogh West 
Shandrum
Treanmanagh 
Tromracastle 	
Tromra East 
Tromra West

Note

Sources

External links
 Map with overview of townlands in the parish

Civil parishes of County Clare